Betrand Fillistorf (born 30 August 1961) is a retired Swiss football goalkeeper.

References

1961 births
Living people
Swiss men's footballers
FC Fribourg players
FC Bulle players
Association football goalkeepers
Swiss Super League players